Raathrikal Ninakku Vendi is a 1979 Indian Malayalam film, directed by Rochy Alex. The film stars Jayan, Krishnachandran, Prameela and Baby Sumathi in the lead roles. The film has musical score by A. T. Ummer.

Cast
Jayan
Krishnachandran
Prameela
Baby Sumathi
Sukumari
Jagathy Sreekumar
Manavalan Joseph
Prathapachandran
Mallika Sukumaran

Soundtrack
The music was composed by A. T. Ummer and the lyrics were written by Mankombu Gopalakrishnan.

References

External links
 

1979 films
1970s Malayalam-language films